The Mallorquín or Caballo Mallorquín is a rare breed of horse indigenous to the island of Mallorca in the Balearic Islands, from which it takes its name. Identification of the breed was begun in 1981 by the Patronato para las Razas Autóctonas de Mallorca ("authority for the autochthonous breeds of Mallorca"). The Mallorquín is listed in the Catálogo Oficial de Razas de Ganado de España in the group of autochthonous breeds in danger of extinction.

History 

The origins of the breed are obscure.  According to a genetic study of "Spanish Celtic horse breeds", the Mallorquín and Menorquín are connected to the now extinct Catalan horse, itself the result of introgression of populations with strong African genetic influence into an original population of Celtic horses introduced to the Iberian peninsula by the Celts in about the eighth century BC. The study showed clear grouping of the two Mediterranean breeds and clear separation from the five "Atlantic" Celtic breeds examined, the Asturcón, Gallego, Jaca Navarra, Losino and Pottok.

Identification of the breed was begun in 1981 by the Patronato para las Razas Autóctonas de Mallorca ("authority for the autochthonous breeds of Mallorca"). The official breed standard was approved in 2003.

The Mallorquín is listed in the Catálogo Oficial de Razas de Ganado de España in the group of autochthonous breeds in danger of extinction. Its status was listed as "critical-maintained" by the Food and Agriculture Organization of the United Nations in 2000 and in 2007. In approximately 2005 the number of Mallorquín horses recorded in the stud-book was 247, but a census conducted by the Ministerio de Medio Ambiente y Medio Rural y Marino in 2003 identified only 172. In 2010 a population of 146 was reported, which by 2018 had risen to 320.

Characteristics 

The Mallorquín may only be black, in all its variations; horses of any other colour can not be registered. Limited white facial markings are permitted, white leg markings are not. It has an upright mane, short, thick, but arched neck, a head with a convex profile but refined bone structure.
Its conformation relates to that of the Andalusian horse

Uses 

This breed is used by the local population only as a riding horse; farm work in the islands was traditionally done by the Balearic donkey. Mallorquín mares were traditionally bred to imported stallions, usually of French Trotter or Orlov Trotter breed, to produce Trotador Español, "Spanish Trotter", horses. Approximately 85% of the Spanish Trotter population is in Mallorca; however, genetic study has found little recent influence of the Mallorquín on the Spanish Trotter breed. They were also much used in the production of mules.

References

Horse breeds
Horse breeds originating in Spain